Gabriel Gilbert (c.1620 – c.1680) was a 17th-century French poet and playwright.

He was secretary of duchesse de Rohan and secretary of commandments by Christina, Queen of Sweden in 1656.

He wrote tragicomedies and tragedies, including Marguerite de France, Téléphonte, Rodogune, Sémiramis, Les Amours de Diane et d'Endymion.

Publications 
1641: Marguerite de France, tragicomedy Text online
1642: Téléphonte, five-act tragicomedy in verse Text online
1646: Rodogune, tragicomedy Text online
1646: Hypolite, ou Le garçon insensible, tragedy, Text online
1647: Sémiramis, tragedy, Text online
1650: Panégyrique des dames, dedicated to Mademoiselle
1656: L'Art de plaire, text online
1657: Les Amours de Diane et d'Endimion, tragedy Text online
1659: Chresphonte, ou le Retour des Héraclides dans le Péloponèse, tragicomedy
1659: Ode à son Eminence
1660: Arie et Petus, ou les Amours de Néron, tragedy
1661: Les Poésies diverses de M. Gilbert
1663: Les Amours d'Ovide pastorale héroïque
1664: Les Amours d'Angélique et de Médor, tragicomedy, text online
1667: Les Intrigues amoureuses, comedy
1672: Les Peines et les Plaisirs de l'amour, pastorale, presented at the Académie royale de musique
1680: Les Psaumes en vers français

Bibliography

External links 

Gilbert and his theatre plays on CÉSAR

17th-century French dramatists and playwrights
17th-century French poets
17th-century French male writers
1620 births
1680 deaths